The Niagara Cantilever Bridge or Michigan Central Railway Cantilever Bridge was a cantilever bridge across the Niagara Gorge. An international railway-only bridge between Canada and the United States, it connected Niagara Falls, New York, and Niagara Falls, Ontario, located just south of the Whirlpool Bridge, and opened to traffic in 1883, it was replaced by the Michigan Central Railway Steel Arch Bridge in 1925.

Background
Although British engineers suggested using the cantilever form as a replacement for non-statically determinate trusses as early as 1846, the first modern cantilever actually built was Heinrich Gerber's Hassfurt Bridge over the Main River in Germany (1867), with a central span of 38 m.

The next important cantilever was built by American engineer C. Shaler Smith, ten years later in 1877. It provided the first practical test of the application of the cantilever principle to long-span bridge design. He built what was then the world's longest cantilever for the Cincinnati Southern Railway over a 366 m wide and 84 m deep gorge of the Kentucky River near Dixville, Kentucky.

Other important counterbalanced spans are the Michigan Central Railroad bridge over the Niagara Gorge (this bridge), designed by Charles Conrad Schneider/Apolda in 1883. With cantilever arms supporting a simple suspended truss, this 151 m span and, the nearly identical Fraser River Bridge in British Columbia, Canada, directed the attention of the engineering world to this new bridge form. These two were the prototypes for subsequent cantilevers, the Poughkeepsie Bridge over the Hudson River in New York, Young's High Bridge over the Kentucky River, the Forth Bridge in Scotland, and the Quebec Bridge in Canada.

Construction history

The Michigan Central Railway Bridge was the dream of financier and railway developer Cornelius Vanderbilt. Vanderbilt needed a rail link between Canada and the USA, but was not prepared to pay the high rental price which the owners of the Lower Arch Bridge (the first railway bridge across the gorge) were asking.

Mr. Vanderbilt owned the Michigan Central Railway and had controlling interest in the Canada Southern Railway. In lieu of paying rent, he decided to build a new bridge. Vanderbilt formed the Niagara River Bridge Company and received a charter to build a new bridge from both the Canadian and US authorities.

On April 9, 1883, the Niagara River Bridge Company signed a contract with the Central Bridge Works Company of Buffalo New York to build this bridge. The chief engineer was Charles C. Schneider. This first bridge of cantilever design at Niagara, was built across the Niagara Gorge by engineer Edmund Hayes, of the Central Bridge Works Company, at a site just south of the Lower Arch Bridge. (the Whirlpool Bridge)

Construction of this bridge began on April 15, 1883. The contractors were working against a deadline of November 1. Every day afterwards, the contractor had to pay a penalty of $500 per day. The 40.3 meter (132.6 ft) high towers were completed on October 11. The contractor soon realized that it would not be possible to complete the bridge and railway tracks by November 1. They anticipated  they could put 25 foot (7.6 m) sections onto each side of the bridge every two days and connect the center span in five days.

Each cantilever measuring 99 meters (325 ft) long and 7.9 meters (26 ft) high where they were anchored were in place by November 18. Two 7.5 meter (25 ft) long sections were attached and extended from each cantilever. The center span was measured and sent to the company's Buffalo, New York plant for fabrication. Each end was made of a section constructed of steel extending from each shoreline nearly half way across the gorge. Each section was supported near its center by a steel tower from which extended two lever arms, one reaching the shore while the other extended over the river 175 feet (53 m) beyond the towers. By the outer arm having no support and being subjected the same as the shore arm to the weight of the trains, a counter advantage is given to the shore arm being firmly anchored to the rock on shore. The towers on each side rose from the water level below. The bridge span was 495 feet (151 m). The ends of the cantilevers extended 395 feet (120 m) from the abutments leaving a gap of 120 feet (37 m) which was filled by an ordinary truss type bridge hung form the ends of the cantilever.

Provisions had been built into this bridge to allow for expansion and contraction, allowing the ends to move freely as the temperature changed. The total length of the bridge was 906 feet (276 m). It had a double track and had the capacity to bear the weight of two trains crossing at the same time producing a side pressure equal to a 75-mile per hour (120 km/h) wind. The railway was 240 feet (73 m) above the Niagara River.

On November 21, media reports indicated that the bridge had been completed, linking Canada and the USA together. On December 1, 1883, the bridge was officially completed. The bridge had cost $700,000 US dollars. On December 6, 1883 at 11:41 a.m., the first crossing of this new bridge was made. It consisted of an engine pulling a tender and passenger car. The passenger car carried a number of dignitaries including railway Superintendent G. H. Burrows.

Schneider's bridge had a useful life of over 40 years during a period when rolling stock on the railroads grew much heavier. The speed of erection of a new style bridge coupled with its performance made it one of the most innovative and significant bridges built in the world up to that time.

List of bridges across the Niagara River 

The Niagara River saw the following crossings in the 19th century (in chronological order):
John Roebling's Niagara Falls Suspension Bridge,
Samuel Keefer's Honeymoon Bridge,
Edward Serrell's Lewiston-Queenston Bridge,
Schneider's cantilever (this bridge),
Leffert Buck's arch bridge at the falls
Buck's Niagara Railway Arch Bridge, built under and into the Roebling's suspension bridge.

See also
 Michigan Central Railway Bridge — 1925 arch bridge that replaced the Niagara Cantilever Bridge

Image links
 From niagara.edu library collection construction image showing tower bent, shoreside falsework, and cantilever section with traveling cantilever crane 
 from niagara.edu library collection operation image showing two trains crossing
 small image showing stabilising guy wires
 Samuel J. Dixon crossing the Gorge on a high-wire on July 17, 1891
 The Bridge in 1894
 Testing the Cantilever Bridge with 20 locomotives Niagarapoetry.ca
 Cantilever Bridge in front of Whirlpool Bridge arch railway bridge
 other way round both from Niagara Falls Railway Museum

Notes and references

External links

 Francis E. Griggs, Jr., Niagara Cantilever, Journal of Bridge Engineering, Volume 8, Issue 1, pp. 2–11 (January/February 2003)
 Niagarafrontier.com article on Michigan Central Cantilever Bridge
 "The Test of Cantilever" poem by James Walton Jackson

Cantilever bridges
Bridges completed in 1883
International railway lines
Bridges in Niagara Falls, Ontario
Bridges in Niagara Falls, New York
Michigan Central Railroad bridges
Bridges over the Niagara River
Railroad bridges in New York (state)
Railway bridges in the Regional Municipality of Niagara
Steel bridges in the United States
Steel bridges in Canada
Cantilever bridges in Canada
Cantilever bridges in the United States
Truss bridges in Canada
Truss bridges in the United States